Breskve u teškom sirupu vol. 1 is a compilation by the Serbian rock band Električni Orgazam, featuring unreleased material from the band's new wave period. The first part of the compilation featuring the recordings made at the Belgrade Tašmajdan park, and the second part, featuring the recordings made at the band rehearsal at the basement of the Studentski Kulturni Centar, were both recorded in the period before the release of Paket aranžman.

Track listing

Koncert na Tašmajdanu 1980 
 "Električni orgazam" (4:21)
 "Konobar" (1:51)
 "Infekcija" (4:59)
 "Zlatni papagaj" (2:22) 
 "Krokodili dolaze" (4:21)
 "Nebo" (4:58)

Proba U Podrumu SKC-a 1980 
 "Zlatni papagaj" (2:40)
 "Vi" (3:07)
 "Fleke" (2:32)
 "Voda u moru" (2:07)
 "Pojmove ne povezujem" (3:03)
 "Leptir" (3:32)
 "Umetnost" (2:08)
 "I've Got a Feeling" (2:37)
 "Krokodili dolaze" (3:44)
 "Nebo" (4:59)

Personnel 
 Srđan Gojković Gile (guitar, vocals)
 Ljubomir Jovanović Jovec (guitar)
 Goran Čavajda Čavke (drums)
 Ljubomir Đukić Ljuba (organ, vocals)
 Marina Vulić (bass)

References

External links 
 Discography page at the official site
 Album information at the official site
 Breskve u teškom sirupu vol. 1 at Discogs
 Album review at Popboks

2006 compilation albums
Električni Orgazam compilation albums